The 1942 season was the Hawthorn Football Club's 18th season in the Victorian Football League and 41st overall.

Fixture

Premiership Season

With World War II happening at the time,  weren't able to compete in the 1942 season due to wartime travel restrictions, whilst  and  struggled to field a team. Hawthorn and Collingwood also withdrew their teams from the reserves competition.

Ladder

References

Hawthorn Football Club seasons